Megachile cyanescens is a species of bee in the family Megachilidae. It was described by Friese in 1904.<ref>DiscoverLife

References

cyanescens
Insects described in 1904